Rambabu Nankhu Pal (1 January 1973 – 13 October 2007) was an Indian cricketer. He played in six first-class and eight List A matches for Uttar Pradesh from 1990/91 to 1996/97. He also played for the Indian under-19 team. Pal later worked in a bank in Kanpur. He committed suicide aged 34, reportedly as a result of "poor mental condition" and teasing suffered at work.

See also
 List of Uttar Pradesh cricketers

References

External links
 

1973 births
2007 deaths
Indian cricketers
Uttar Pradesh cricketers
Cricketers from Allahabad
Suicides in India